Darreh Bid-e Murzard (also Romanized as Darreh Bīd-e Mūrzard; also known as Darreh Bīd) is a village in Margown Rural District, Margown District, Boyer-Ahmad County, Kohgiluyeh and Boyer-Ahmad Province, Iran. At the 2006 census, its population was 151, in 32 families.

References 

Populated places in Boyer-Ahmad County